Bafou is a small municipality situated in the west of Cameroon, in the West region, Menoua division and Nkongni subdivision. Bafou is populated by the Bamileke people, situated at approximately 10 km from Dschang the closest city. The rural economy is  sustain by agriculture, except some  few government worker civil servant, the large part of the population depends on  agriculture.

See also
Communes of Cameroon

References
 Site de la primature - Élections municipales 2002 
 Contrôle de gestion et performance des services publics communaux des villes camerounaises - Thèse de Donation Avele, Université Montesquieu Bordeaux IV 
 Charles Nanga, La réforme de l’administration territoriale au Cameroun à la lumière de la loi constitutionnelle n° 96/06 du 18 janvier 1996, Mémoire ENA. 

Populated places in West Region (Cameroon)
Communes of Cameroon